Helxine may refer to:
 a genus of plants in the nettle family Urticaceae containing a single species, Helxine soleirolii, a synonym of Soleirolia soleirolii
 a genus of plants in the knotweed family Polygonaceae, including the following species
 Helxine convolvulus, a synonym of Fallopia convolvulus 
 Helxine multiflorum, a synonym of Reynoutria multiflora 
 Helxine scandens, a synonym of Fallopia scandens 
 Helxine saggitatum, a synonym of Persicaria sagittata